Mirto may refer to:

People
 Alexander Mirto Frangipani, Roman Catholic prelate
 Fabio Mirto Frangipani (died 1587), Roman Catholic prelate
 Mirto Davoine (1933-1999), Uruguayan football player
 Mirto Picchi (1915-1980), Italian dramatic tenor
 Ottavio Mirto Frangipani Frangipani (1544-1612), Italian bishop
 Peter G. Mirto (1915-2001), American politician

Places
 Mirto, Sicily, village in the province of Messina, Italy

Other
 Mirto (liqueur), alcoholic drink popular in the Mediterranean islands of Sardinia, Corsica and Capraia
 mirto, the common Italian name for myrtaceae plants, which the liqueur is named after